Hedriodiscus binotatus is a species of soldier fly in the family Stratiomyidae.

Distribution
Canada, United States, Mexico.

References

Stratiomyidae
Insects described in 1866
Taxa named by Hermann Loew
Diptera of North America